Gregory Stuart Lee White (born 31 March 1960) better known as Vince White, is a British guitarist, best known as one of the guitarists recruited by The Clash to replace Mick Jones after he was fired from the band in 1983.

Biography
Vince White was born in Marylebone, London, England, on 31 March 1960.

White graduated in astronomy and physics from University College London in 1981, and in fine art from Middlesex University in North London.

White, along with Nick Sheppard, was one of the guitarists recruited by The Clash to replace Mick Jones when he left the band in 1983. He toured with the band, but only made a minimal appearance on the album Cut the Crap. The band finally split up in 1986.

In 2007, White wrote his account of the final tumultuous years of The Clash, titled Out of Control: The Last Days of The Clash published by Moving Target books. He is currently an artist living in Notting Hill, west London.

Notes

References

External links
 
 
 

1960 births
English punk rock guitarists
Living people
People from Marylebone
The Clash members
Alumni of University College London
Alumni of Middlesex University